The R594 road is a regional road in County Cork, Ireland. It travels from the R586 at Aghaville to the R593 at Derreeny.

References

Regional roads in the Republic of Ireland
Roads in County Cork